Rotoiti may be:

Places
Lake Rotoiti (Bay of Plenty), a lake in the Bay of Plenty area of New Zealand
Rotoiti, Bay of Plenty, a locality on the shore of Lake Rotoiti
Lake Rotoiti (Tasman), a lake in the Tasman area of New Zealand
Mount Rotoiti, a peak in the Frigate Range, Antarctica
Rotoiti, the former name of Saint Arnaud, New Zealand

Ships
, a list of Royal New Zealand Navy ships
Rotoiti-class inshore patrol vessel, a class of ships of the Royal New Zealand Navy

See also
Rotoitidae, a family of parasitic wasps
Rotoita basalis, a wasp in the family Rotoitidae